"The Corps" is a poetic hymn associated with the United States Military Academy. It is second in importance to only the Academy's Alma Mater. The words were written by West Point Chaplain, Bishop H.S. Shipman, around 1902. The accompanying music was composed in 1910 specially for the ceremonial closing of the Old Cadet Chapel and opening of the new Cadet Chapel. "The Corps" was first sung on the steps of the Cadet Chapel on 12 June 1910, and became part of the graduation ceremony starting in 1911. Today, "The Corps" is typically sung by the Cadet Glee Club (West Point's choir) in companion to the Alma Mater at alumni gatherings, graduation, memorial ceremonies and funerals.

Lyrics
The original words to The Corps, as written in 1902 are:

Gender specific lyrics controversy
In 2008, the superintendent of the United States Military Academy, LTG Franklin L. Hagenbeck ordered a change to the lyrics of The Corps and the Alma Mater. The change was to remove gender-specific language in both century-old songs, which were both written at the turn of the 20th century, when the academy only admitted male cadets. LTG Hagenbeck wrote a letter to the Association of Graduates explaining the reasoning for his decision. Many graduates objected to this alteration of the original and hallowed lyrics of West Point songs, but to no avail. A poll taken of former graduates resulted in a majority of objections, but the Superintendent proceeded to make the changes notwithstanding.

The changes to The Corps' lyrics were thus:

 FROM: "The men of the Corps long dead"          TO:  "The ranks of the Corps long dead"
 FROM:  "We sons of today, we salute you"           TO:  "The Corps of today, we salute you"
 FROM:  "You sons of an earlier day"                      TO:  The Corps of an earlier day"
 FROM:  "And the last man feels to his marrow"  TO:  "And the last one feels to the marrow"

References

United States Military Academy
Military music